Tom Kincaid (July 23, 1883 - July 6, 1910) was an American racecar driver, born in Indianapolis, Indiana.

Racing career
Kincaid is known to have started at least 23 AAA-sanctioned races, during the years 1909–1910.  He drove primarily for the team operated by Indianapolis-based auto maker, National.  However, at least one 1910 race result shows him driving a Great Western.  Kincaid was killed in a testing accident at the Indianapolis Motor Speedway, on July 6, 1910

Race wins
Kincaid won a total of three races at the Indianapolis Motor Speedway, including the 1910 100-mile Prest-O-Lite Trophy Race.  His other victories included a 1910 200-mile race at the Atlanta Motordrome.

Sources

 Scott, D. Bruce; INDY: Racing Before the 500; Indiana Reflections; 2005; .
 Galpin, Darren;  A Record of Motorsport Racing Before World War I.
 http://www.motorsport.com/stats
 http://www.champcarstats.com

1883 births
1910 deaths
Racing drivers from Indiana
Racing drivers from Indianapolis